Lenore Miller (born March 10, 1932) is an American former labor union leader.

Born in Union City, New Jersey, Miller studied at Rutgers University, Purdue University, and the The New School for Social Research.  In 1958, she began working as a secretary at the Retail, Wholesale and Department Store Union (RWDSU), and was soon promoted to become assistant to the union's president.  In 1978, she was elected as a vice president of the union, then in 1980, as its secretary-treasurer.  In 1986, she was elected as president of the union, the first woman to serve in the post.  The following year, she became a vice president of the AFL-CIO and the first woman union president to service on the federation's executive council.

As the leader of the union, Miller campaigned for improved day care provision, and for family leave to be more widely available.  She campaigned on health and safety at work, and for the representation of low paid workers by unions.  She served on the executives of the International Union of Food, Agricultural, Hotel, Restaurant, Catering, Tobacco and Allied Workers' Associations and the International Federation of Commercial, Clerical, Professional and Technical Employees, in which roles she campaigned for democracy and human rights around the world.  She also served as vice chair of the President's Committee on Employment of People with Disabilities, and as president of the Jewish Labor Committee.

Under her leadership, in 1993, the RWDSU affiliated to the United Food and Commercial Workers, while retaining its separate identity.  Miller retired in 1998.

References

1932 births
Living people
American trade union leaders
Jewish American trade unionists
People from Union City, New Jersey
Purdue University alumni
Rutgers University alumni
The New School alumni
Trade unionists from New Jersey